"No Flockin" is the debut single by American rapper Kodak Black. The song, a rap freestyle over an instrumental of the same name produced by Vinnyx (VinnyxProd), eventually peaked at 95 on the US Billboard Hot 100 in January 2017. The song was initially released on July 27, 2014, on Kodak Black's official YouTube account, before being released on iTunes on July 6, 2015, by Dollaz N Dealz Entertainment, Sniper Gang and Atlantic Records.

Kodak's flow on the song was sampled/interpolated in "Bodak Yellow" by American rapper Cardi B, which was released in June 2017. The song would go on to top the Billboard Hot 100 in late September 2017 and was certified Diamond in 2021, becoming the first song to be certified diamond by a female rapper. Kodak responded with, "Bodak Yellow Went Diamond Dam Right".

Music video
The song's accompanying music video premiered on August 25, 2014, on Kodak Black's official YouTube account. As of April 2020, the music video currently has over 205 million views.

Commercial performance
"No Flockin" debuted at number 95 on US Billboard Hot 100 for the chart dated January 14, 2017, over 2 years after the song's initial release date. The following week, the song dropped off of the Hot 100. The song was Kodak Black's first charting song as a lead artist, and his second charting entry following his feature on French Montana's "Lockjaw". In June 2017, the song was certified Platinum by the Recording Industry Association of America (RIAA) for sales of over 1,000,000 digital copies in the United States.

No Flockin 2 (Bodak Orange)

On September 19, 2017, Kodak Black released "No Flockin 2 (Bodak Orange)", an updated version of "No Flockin" featuring the same instrumental as the original but with all new lyrics.  The song's title and lyrics include references to Cardi B's "Bodak Yellow", and the song's lyrical content also contains jabs to other rappers jacking his flow.

An accompanying music video to the song was released on the same day through Kodak Black's official YouTube account. The video was directed by Kodak Black himself and currently has over 21 million views as of September 24, 2022.

Charts

Certifications

References

2015 debut singles
2014 songs
Kodak Black songs
Songs written by Kodak Black